Ruidoso is a village in Lincoln County, New Mexico, United States, adjacent to the Lincoln National Forest. The population was 8,029 at the 2010 census. The city of Ruidoso Downs and the unincorporated area of Alto are suburbs of Ruidoso, and contribute to the Ruidoso Micropolitan Statistical Area's population of 21,223.

A mountain resort town, Ruidoso lies in the Sierra Blanca mountain range of south-central New Mexico, where it merges with the Sacramento Mountains to the south. Ruidoso is a resort community close to the slopes of Ski Apache, the Mescalero Apache Tribe-owned ski resort on Sierra Blanca, an almost  mountain. The tribe also operates the Inn of the Mountain Gods resort in the area, which includes a casino, hotel, arcade room and golf course. Ruidoso is the largest community in Lincoln County, and serves as the regional economic hub.

In recent years the village is contending with serious questions about the adequacy of the local water supply and zoning enforcement. As in many small communities that have been recently "discovered", there is an ongoing debate about how best to plan for additional growth.

The village received its name from the Rio Ruidoso (Spanish for "Noisy River"), a small stream that weaves through the city.

History
Along the eastern foothills of White Mountain, retired army Captain Paul Dowlin built Dowlin’s Mill where the Carrizo Creek and Rio Ruidoso merge. He had served at nearby Fort Stanton. The Mill was also a general store, dance hall, and moonshine supply.

San Patricio, NM (in the Hondo Valley) was originally known as Ruidoso. In 1875, its name was changed in honor of a Catholic priest’s patron saint. Early Hispanos used the term “Ruidoso” to describe a noisy creek. Today’s Ruidoso grew up around Dowlin’s Mill. Will Dowlin survived his brother, after an employee shot Captain Paul dead.

By 1885, with a general store, blacksmith, post office, cabins along the Rio Ruidoso, and proximity to the Chisholm Trail . . . Ruidoso, NM was born.

The Wingfield family operated a dairy and early post office. By 1914, cabins were being built in Upper Canyon. At Cedar Creek in 1935, a ski area opened on a sloping meadow. By 1947, a race track was opened at Hollywood Park. Visitors played golf in the Gateway area. Finally, in 1963 the Mescalero Apaches purchased the ski area now known as Ski Apache.

In December 2006, seven percent of eligible voters approved a $12.6 million bond issue to finance the expansion and modernization of the local wastewater treatment plant which was built in 1982. In 2011, construction was completed on a $36 million wastewater treatment plant. This state-of-the-art facility utilizes membrane technology to achieve discharge standards within regulatory guidelines. The plant was designed to accommodate future growth. The average daily volume is 1.6 million gallons. The plant can currently process up to 2.7 million gallons per day.

The town and the river were hit by devastating flash flooding from late at night on July 26, 2008, through July 27, 2008. Hundreds of tourists, campers and residents were evacuated and the storm caused damage at the Ruidoso Downs Race Track. One person was killed in the flooding, approximately 900 persons required rescue, approximately 500 structures were damaged, and initial damage estimates for Ruidoso were in the range of $15– 20 million.

In March 2016 the village of Ruidoso entered into a Sister City relationship with Puerto Peñasco, Sonora, Mexico.

In April 2022, large parts of Ruidoso were threatened by the McBride Fire; over 200 structures were destroyed and 2 people were killed by the blaze, fueled by intense dryness and strong winds.

Geography
Ruidoso's southern border and westernmost border follow the Otero County line. The village is bordered to the east by the city of Ruidoso Downs. U.S. Route 70 passes through the southeast part of the village, following the valley of Carrizo Creek upstream from the Rio Ruidoso. The highway leads east down the valley of the Rio Ruidoso and Rio Hondo  to Roswell and southwest over Apache Summit  to Tularosa. New Mexico State Road 48 passes through the center of Ruidoso on Sudderth Drive, the village's main street, and leads north  to Capitan.

Climate
According to the Köppen-Geiger climate classification system, Ruidoso has a Subtropical highland climate (Cwb) due to its moderate temperature ranges and precipitation throughout the year. Bi-modal precipitation falls as rain during summer monsoon and as winter snow. Snowfall varies highly by the year.

Demographics

As of the census of 2010, there were 7,868 people, 3,434 households, and 2,232 families residing in the village. The population density was 538.7 people per square mile (208.0/km). There were 7,584 housing units at an average density of 530.8 per square mile (204.9/km). The racial makeup of the village was 85.70 percent White, 0.29 percent African American, 2.38 percent Native American, 0.31 percent Asian, 0.03 percent Pacific Islander, 7.44 percent from other races, and 2.05 percent from two or more races. Hispanic or Latino of any race were 18.21 percent of the population.

There were 3,434 households, out of which 23.6 percent had children under the age of 18 living with them, 53.2 percent were married couples living together, 8.8 percent had a female householder with no husband present, and 35.0 percent were non-families. 29.8 percent of all households were made up of individuals, and 11.3 percent had someone living alone who was 65 years of age or older. The average household size was 2.22 and the average family size was 2.72.

In the village, the population was spread out, with 20.5 percent under the age of 18, 5.8 percent from 18 to 24, 21.9 percent from 25 to 44, 30.1 percent from 45 to 64, and 21.6 percent who were 65 years of age or older. The median age was 46 years. For every 100 females, there were 90.3 males. For every 100 females age 18 and over, there were 87.1 males.

The median income for a household in the village was $37,107, and the median income for a family was $44,846. Males had a median income of $30,452 versus $21,974 for females. The per capita income for the village was $22,721. About 2.5 percent of families and 4.9 percent of the population were below the poverty line, including 24.5 percent of those under age 18 and 5.8 percent of those age 65 or over.

Education
All public schools operate under the Ruidoso Municipal School District.

Public schools

 Sierra Vista Primary School: Pre K, Kindergarten, 1st and 2nd Grade
 White Mountain Elementary School: 3rd-5th Grade
 Ruidoso Middle School: 6th-8th Grade
 Ruidoso High School: 9th-12th Grade

Colleges
 ENMU-Ruidoso Branch Community College. The ENMU Ruidoso Campus is a two-year college, or community college, (one of 18 New Mexico branches) and an official Branch of ENMU (this status was granted in July 2005).

Public library

Ruidoso Public Library is the library serving Ruidoso, Ruidoso Downs, Alto, and greater Lincoln County.

Starting in 1954, the library developed from the Woman's Club, Beta Sigma Phi with only a small collection of books. In 1960 the Library Advisory Board was created, and Jane Parks served as the first President of the Advisory Board. Shortly after, the library was moved into a building that was once a school and Old City Hall. The library was only two rooms which the librarian Pat Ward oversaw its maintenance. In 1966, under the director Ruth McGuire Spiegel the library was moved to an old airport terminal and now had the bonus of local and state funding. The first library building was built in 1975 at 501 Sudderth Dr. and the library remained in this location for around twenty years.

In 1997 the current library was designed and built by ASA Architectures, the two-story building with vaulted windows is 14,600 square feet. The library has a garden, the Friends’ Book Shoppe, an outdoor reading patio and available window seats. In addition, the library also includes an archive room, conference room, children’s, and teen's library, two self-checkout machines and twenty-nine computers for public use. The collection consists of books, CDs, DVDs, and an e-branch with access to e-books, audio books and magazines. Some of the programs offered at the Ruidoso Public Library are children’s section, adult game night, teen scene, Ruidoso writers publishing group and a bereavement support group. Also, the library offers the New Mexico FamilyPass which provides free admission to fifteen museums and historical sites across the state. The library is open Monday-Saturday.

Sports
The Ruidoso Osos were an independent professional baseball team in the Pecos League during the 2011 season. The team was on hiatus for the 2012 season because of low attendance. There were no lights on the team's home field, meaning games were played at 4:30 p.m. Additionally, alcohol could not be sold at White Mountain Park because it was owned by Ruidoso Municipal Schools. In the 2013 season, the team moved to Raton and were renamed the Raton Osos.

Transportation

Airports

Major highways
 U.S. Route 70
 NM 48

Notable people

 Mary Ann Almager, world champion boxer 
 Neil Patrick Harris, actor; grew up in Ruidoso
 Yvette Herrell, congresswoman and former member of the New Mexico House of Representatives
 Mike Runnels, lieutenant governor of New Mexico from 1983 to 1987; lived in Ruidoso
 Bram van der Stok, aka Dr. Bram "Bob" Vanderstok, WWII flying ace and hero of "The Great Escape" from Stalag Luft III

See also
Noisy Water Winery
Ruidoso River Museum

References

External links

 
 Ruidoso Valley Chamber of Commerce
 Ruidoso Tourism Office

Villages in Lincoln County, New Mexico
Villages in New Mexico
Micropolitan areas of New Mexico
Year of establishment missing
Public libraries in New Mexico
Library buildings completed in 1974
Library buildings completed in 1998